The World of Glass is a local museum and visitor centre in St Helens, Merseyside, England. The museum is dedicated to the local history of the town and borough primarily through the lens of the glass industry but also looking at other local industries.

The World of Glass was founded in 2000 and is an amalgamation of the former Pilkington Glass and St Helens Borough Council Collections. The purpose built premises was constructed adjacent to the Pilkingtons glassworks and the stretch of the St Helens Canal known as the "Hotties".

The World of Glass was named as England's Best Small Visitor Attraction (2006).

History 

In the early 1990s Pilkingtons undertook the £1m restoration of the Grade II*-listed Pilkington's Jubilee Cone building, a brick cone structure built in 1887 to house the first ever continuous glass making furnace. Following the restoration Pilkingtons floated the idea of utilising now redundant factory space adjacent (known locally as "The Hotties") as a museum for its historic glass collection. With subsequent interest from the Borough Council looking for somewhere to host their collection of local historical art collection, the centre was funded through a National Heritage Lottery Fund contribution of £8,385,000 and European support in the form of Objective One and RECHAR II grants totalling £2,240,000 in addition to other grants.

The £14m visitor centre was opened in March 2000 in a ceremony attended by the first Chairman of the World of Glass and former Chairman of Pilkington Glass Sir Antony Pilkington, the Mayor of St Helens Councillor Patricia Jackson as well as St Helens R.F.C. players and other dignitaries and special guests including local school children.

Museum & visitor centre
The museum and visitor centre comprises:
 The Pilkington collection - once part of the Pilkington Glass Museum, previously located at the company's headquarters on Prescot Road.
 The History of St Helens collection - from the St Helens museum, previously located on College Street.

Currently the museum holds a total of over 7,000 artefacts.

The museum has two main galleries - the Glass Roots Gallery and the Earth into Light Gallery. The first is concerned with the history of glass, its role in everyday life, and contains artefacts that date back as far as Ancient Egypt. The second tells the story of the growth of the town of St Helens as it moved from relative insignificance to become a world leader in glassmaking.

There are live glassblowing demonstrations daily and you even get the chance to try the art of glass blowing on one of their courses.The Victorian furnace and underground tunnels of the world's first regenerative glass making furnace, built in 1887 by William Windle Pilkington, can also be explored at the visitor centre.

There is an Artisan Gift Shop to browse and a café where coffee, afternoon teas and light lunches can be enjoyed, while looking out over the stretch of the St Helens Sankey Canal known as the Hotties.

The Manchester Airport Chandelier
Since 2008 the World of Glass has been home to one of four chandeliers, restored by David Malik & Son, which originally hung in the main hall of Manchester Airport. With 1,300 clear, smoked grey and amethyst lead glass droplets, individually blown by master craftsman Bruno Zanetti and weighing a staggering two tons, each chandelier was commissioned at a cost of £3,000 in the 1960s but would now cost more than £250,000.

The Clare Island Lighthouse Optic 
Off the west coast of Ireland, Clare Island Lighthouse was decommissioned in 1965 after almost 160 years service. The lighthouse optic, made in 1913 by Chance Brothers of Birmingham, found a new home at the Pilkington Glass Museum and then the World of Glass.

The Clare Island Lighthouse itself was transformed into an upmarket guesthouse.

St Helens Library
A brand-new lending library for St Helens, provided by St Helens Council, opened at the World of Glass in September 2020. Occupying space on both the ground floor and mezzanine level of the World of Glass, the lending library is for both children and adults, complete with more than 18,000 brand-new books.

Gallery

References

External links 

Museums in Merseyside
Tourist attractions in Merseyside
Glass museums and galleries